Keit Pentus-Rosimannus (born 3 March 1976) is an Estonian politician who served as Minister of Finance in the government of Prime Minister Kaja Kallas between 26 January 2021 and 19 October 2022. She is also the vice-chairwoman of the biggest parliament party Reform Party and former chairwoman of its parliamentary faction.

Pentus-Rosimannus previously served as Minister of Foreign Affairs from 2014 to 2015 and as Minister of the Environment from 2011 to 2014.

Early life and education
Pentus-Rosimannus studied piano in Tallinn Musical High School and in Tallinn Baccalaureate Private School (today’s University Nord), which she graduated from in 1995 with honours. In 2000 Pentus-Rosimannus graduated from Tallinn Pedagogical University (today’s Tallinn University) majoring in public administration and European Union relations. Pentus continued her MA studies in political science in University of Tartu, but did not complete her degree.

Political career
Pentus-Rosimannus' first contact with Reform Party took place in 1996 when she was hired as an election manager on her second year in university. In 1997 Rosimannus and Kristen Michal (later secretary-general of Reform party) established a club for young politicians which now has 4000 members.

Pentus-Rosimannus has been a member of Reform Party since 1998.

Pentus-Rosimannus has worked as a political advisor in Ministry of Justice, Ministry of Social Affairs and Ministry of Foreign Affairs. In 2003, Pentus was offered a position of district governor of central Tallinn. She managed the district for 2 years, during which she initiated a thematic plan for high-rise buildings, a comprehensive plan aimed at the protection of the built-up area of cultural and environmental value, discussions on the future of the Old Town; she also managed to tidy up Musumägi, arranged the lighting of Schnell Park and Lembitu Park, helped modernize several kindergartens in Tallinn and summoned the round tables of the headmasters of schools, heads of kindergartens as well as apartment associations.

After the breakup of the Tallinn city coalition in 2005, Pentus-Rosimannus became the head of Prime Minister Andrus Ansip's office.

In 2007 Pentus-Rosimannus ran for the parliament, receiving 7049 votes.  During the term, she served as chairman of the parliamentary faction of Reform Party, and was a member of the Finance Committee.

Pentus-Rosimannus is also a member of parliamentary groups of Great Britain, USA, China, Ukraine, Azerbaijan, Slovakia, Germany and Turkey. She is a council member of the State Real Estate PLC, council member of the Educational and Conference Centre of Christian Culture and Ethical Values of Tallinn Dome Church and a council member of the Support Union of Grandparents.

In the 2015 election, Pentus-Rosimannus was chosen for another term with 5,716 votes. She started as the Minister of Foreign Affairs in Taavi Rõivas' second cabinet on 17 November 2014. On 1 July 2015, Pentus-Rosimannus resigned following the Tallinn Circuit Court decision which made her partly liable for debts accumulated by her father's bankrupt company Autorollo.

Other activities

European Union organizations
 European Investment Bank (EIB), Ex-Officio Member of the Board of Governors (since 2021)
 European Stability Mechanism (ESM), Member of the Board of Governors (since 2021)

International organizations
 European Bank for Reconstruction and Development (EBRD), Ex-Officio Member of the Board of Governors (since 2021)
 Nordic Investment Bank (NIB), Ex-Officio Member of the Board of Governors (since 2021)
 Multilateral Investment Guarantee Agency (MIGA), World Bank Group, Ex-Officio Member of the Board of Governors (since 2021)
 World Bank, Ex-Officio Member of the Board of Governors (since 2021)

Personal life
Her brother Sten is a racing driver. On 10 August 2012, Pentus married Rain Rosimannus.

Sources
Keit Pentus at the website of Estonian Parliament
This article includes content from the Estonian Wikipedia article Keit Pentus.

References

External links

 Keit Pentus blog
 Reform Party´s homepage

|-

|-

|-

1976 births
Living people
21st-century Estonian politicians
21st-century Estonian women politicians
Environment ministers of Estonia
Estonian Reform Party politicians
Female foreign ministers
Members of the Riigikogu, 2007–2011
Members of the Riigikogu, 2011–2015
Members of the Riigikogu, 2015–2019
Members of the Riigikogu, 2019–2023
Ministers of Foreign Affairs of Estonia
Politicians from Tallinn
Tallinn University alumni
Women government ministers of Estonia
Women members of the Riigikogu
Female finance ministers
Members of the Riigikogu, 2003–2007